Cnemaspis biocellata, also known as the twin-spot rock gecko, is a species of gecko endemic to western Malaysia.

References

Cnemaspis
Reptiles described in 2008